Girl, Stop Apologizing: A Shame-Free Plan for Embracing and Achieving Your Goals is a self-help book by American author Rachel Hollis. It follows her 2018 best-seller Girl, Wash Your Face. It was both a Publishers Weekly and New York Times best-seller.

References 

2019 non-fiction books
Self-help books
HarperCollins books